In urban planning, Brusselization (UK and US) or Brusselisation (UK variant) is "the indiscriminate and careless introduction of modern high-rise buildings into gentrified neighbourhoods" and has become a byword for "haphazard urban development and redevelopment."

The notion applies to anywhere whose development follows the pattern of the uncontrolled development of Brussels in the 1960s and 1970s, that resulted from a lack of zoning regulations and the city authorities' laissez-faire approach to city planning.

Brussels

Historical precedent and underpinnings for modernization in Brussels
The 1950s was not the first time that Brussels had been radically altered by major redevelopment. Two prior sweeping changes to the city's urban fabric were the straight-lined central boulevards modeled after Paris, which were created following the covering and diverting of the river Senne, as well as the North–South railway connection, which took around forty years to finish (1911–1952), and which had left swaths of the city center filled with debris and craters for decades. Another precedent was the construction of the Palace of Justice, the largest building erected in the 19th century (1866–1883), for which a section of the Marolles/Marollen neighbourhood was demolished.

The writer André de Vries asserts that the penchant for heavy-handedness can be traced back to the reign of King Leopold II in the late 19th century, and possibly even all the way back to the bombardment of the city by Louis XIV's troops in 1695. "There is barely one building still standing", he says, "from before 1695, with the exception of some churches and the Town Hall". Leopold II sought to give Brussels the image of a grand capital city of an imperial/colonial power. By the middle 20th century, there was a tacit alliance between urban development entrepreneurs and local government, with a modernist agenda and with their sights set firmly on large-scale development projects. The citizens of Brussels were largely left out of the process.

From the 1960s to the 1980s

The original Brusselization was the type of urban regeneration performed by Brussels in connection with the 1958 Brussels World's Fair (Expo '58). In order to prepare the city for Expo '58, buildings were torn down without regard either to their architectural or historical importance, high-capacity square office or apartment buildings were built, boulevards were created and tunnels dug. Among the most controversial was the large-scale demolition of town houses for development of the high-rise business district in the Northern Quarter. All of these changes were designed to quickly increase the number of people working and living in the city and improve transportation.

Further radical changes resulted from Brussels's role as the center of the EU and NATO, beginning with the construction of the European Commission's headquarters in 1959. The introduction of a high-speed rail network in the 1990s was the latest excuse to speculate on multiple rows of properties for modern office or hotel redevelopment, which led to the razing of neighborhood blocks near Brussels-South railway station.

These changes caused outcry amongst the citizens of Brussels and by environmentalist and preservationist organizations. The demolition of Victor Horta's Art Nouveau Maison du Peuple/Volkshuis in 1965 was one focus of such protests, as was the construction of the IBM Tower in 1978. Many architects also protested, and it was the architectural world that coined the name Brusselization for what was happening to Brussels. Architects such as Léon Krier and Maurice Culot formulated an anti-capitalist urban planning theory, as a rejection of the rampant modernism that they saw overtaking Brussels.

The 1990s: From Brusselization to façadism

In the early 1990s, laws were introduced in Brussels restricting the demolition of buildings that were deemed to have architectural or historical significance, and in 1999, the city authorities' urban development plan explicitly declared high-rise buildings to be architecturally incompatible with the existing aesthetics of the city centre. This led to the rise of what was termed façadisme, i.e. the destruction of the whole interior of a historic building while preserving its historic façade, with new buildings erected behind or around it.

These laws were the Town Planning Act 1991, which gave local authorities the powers to refuse demolition requests on the grounds of historical, aesthetic, or cultural significance, and to designate architectural heritage zones; and the Heritage Conservation Act of 1993, which gave the government of the Brussels-Capital Region the power to designate buildings to be protected for historic reasons. However, this system had its deficiencies. Whilst the Capital Region's government could designate historic buildings, it was the nineteen municipal authorities within it that were responsible for demolition permits. Not until the introduction of a  system was this internecine conflict resolved.

See also
 Californication
 Historic preservation
 
 Manhattanization
 Venice Charter
 Redevelopment of Norrmalm
 Vancouverism

References

Cross-reference

Sources used

Further reading
 
 
 
 

Urban studies and planning terminology
Historic preservation
Architectural history
20th century in Brussels
Urban decay in Europe